Joe Reece Salter (born August 13, 1943) is a former state legislator in Louisiana. He served as Speaker of the Louisiana House of Representatives.

He represented District 24 and belonged to the Democratic Party. He served in the House from 1986 to 2008, when term limits prevented him from running for reelection.

He was inducted into the Sabine Hall of Fame.

See also
List of speakers of the Louisiana House of Representatives

References

Living people
1943 births
Speakers of the Louisiana House of Representatives
Democratic Party members of the Louisiana House of Representatives
20th-century American politicians
21st-century American politicians